Dangerous Traffic is a 1926 American dramatic, action silent film directed by Bennett Cohen and starring Francis X. Bushman Jr. and Mildred Harris.

A preserved film available on DVD.

Plot
A young reporter for the small coastal California village newspaper Seaside Record, Ned Charters (Francis X. Bushman Jr.) begins to investigate the criminal activities of a gang of liquor smugglers after two revenue agents Tom Kennedy (Jack Perrin) and Harvey Leonard (Hal Walters) are caught in a shoot-out. Tom survives the attack, but Harvey is killed. Harvey's young sister Helen Leonard (Mildred Harris), who works as a cigarette girl at the gang's local hangout, the Surfridge Inn, vows revenge and begins to assist Ned in his investigation of the smugglers. After Tom Kennedy recovers he joins the trio in bringing the gang to justice. Along the way, car chases and gun battles ensue, with Ned at one point jumping from a speeding motorcycle to intercept a runaway automobile. By film's end, the gang of smugglers is imprisoned and Ned and Helen have found true love with one another.

Cast
Francis X. Bushman Jr. - Ned Charters
Jack Perrin - Tom Kennedy
Mildred Harris - Helen Leonard
Tom London - Marc Brandon
Ethan Laidlaw - Foxy Jim Stone
Hal Walters - Harvey Leonard

References

External links

1926 films
American silent feature films
American black-and-white films
1920s action drama films
Films directed by Bennett Cohen
American action drama films
1926 drama films
Surviving American silent films
1920s American films
Silent American drama films
Silent action drama films